Sturgis Municipal Airport  is a public use airport located two nautical miles (4 km) east of the central business district of Sturgis, a city in Union County, Kentucky, United States. It is owned by the Union County Air Board. The airport was built in 1941 by the U.S. Army to provide pilot training during World War II.

Although most U.S. airports use the same three-letter location identifier for the FAA and IATA, this airport is assigned TWT by the FAA but has no designation from the IATA (which assigned TWT to an airport in Tawitawi, Philippines).

Facilities and aircraft
It has one asphalt paved runway designated 18/36 which measures 5,000 by 150 feet (1,524 x 46 m). For the 12-month period ending February 7, 2006, the airport had 9,250 aircraft operations, an average of 25 per day: 90% general aviation, 8% air taxi and 2% military.

References

External links
 Sturgis Municipal Airport, official site
 
 

Airports in Kentucky
Airfields of the United States Army Air Forces in Kentucky
Buildings and structures in Union County, Kentucky